Real Aranjuez Club de Fútbol is a Spanish football team based in Aranjuez, in the autonomous community of Madrid. Founded in 1948 it plays in Tercera División – Group 7, holding home matches at Estadio El Deleite, with a capacity of 8,000 seats.

History
Aranjuez spent the vast majority of its years in the fourth division, with a four-year stint in the third level (1992–93, 1994–97). 

From 2005–07 it suffered consecutive relegations, which left the club in Primera Aficionados (sixth division). Aranjuez immediately gained promotion again, finishing with more points than any of the other group champions.

Season to season

4 seasons in Segunda División B
35 seasons in Tercera División

Former players
 Pepín
 Óscar Téllez
 Andrés Malango
 Dmitri Cheryshev

Women's team
Since 2016, Real Aranjuez has also a women's team. It currently plays in the Regional Leagues of the Community of Madrid.

Season by season

References

External links
Official website 
Team profile at Futmadrid 

Football clubs in the Community of Madrid
Association football clubs established in 1948
1948 establishments in Spain
Sport in Aranjuez
Organisations based in Spain with royal patronage